A list of Hong Kong films released in 2019:

See also
2019 in Hong Kong

References

External links
 IMDB list of Hong Kong films  

2019
Films
Hong Kong
Hong Kong